Aschisma is a genus of moss in family Pottiaceae.

Species include:

 Aschisma kansanum A.L. Andrews

Pottiaceae
Taxonomy articles created by Polbot
Moss genera